Turner Hall is a historic building located in Postville, Iowa, United States.  A Turn Verein  was a German social and athletic organization.  Because Allamakee County in general, and Postville in particular, had a significant German immigrant population a Turn Verein was organized here.  Their first building was a frame structure on Green Street, but when it proved insufficient they built this two-story brick structure in 1914.  While the local German population used the facility for their gymnastics and other social customs, it also was used by the community at large as a community center.  Three weeks after it opened the community filled the hall to capacity to hear Postville native John Mott, national leader of the YMCA, speak.  He would win the Nobel Peace Prize in 1946.  From 1940 to 1990 the building housed the Postville city hall.  Even during these years, and after, it was a meeting place for various community organizations.  The building was listed on the National Register of Historic Places in 2000.

References

Cultural infrastructure completed in 1914
Buildings and structures in Allamakee County, Iowa
National Register of Historic Places in Allamakee County, Iowa
Clubhouses on the National Register of Historic Places in Iowa
German-American history
German-American culture in Iowa